"" is the official anthem of the Balearic island of Majorca, Spain. It is based on a poem by Joan Alcover i Maspons about an ancient Majorcan children's song. The music is a work by Catalan composer Amadeu Vives, and in November 1996 the Consell Insular de Mallorca made it the anthem for the Island.

Lyrics

References 

Spanish anthems
Regional songs
Balearic music
Catalan-language songs
Culture of Mallorca